The Very Best of Tom Fogerty is a compilation of various material from rock musician Tom Fogerty's solo career. It was released July 27, 1999 on the Varèse Sarabande label.

Track listing
All songs written by Tom Fogerty, except where noted.
 "Goodbye Media Man" – 6:09
 "The Legend of Alcatraz" – 2:36
 "Lady of Fatima" – 4:36
 "Beauty Is Under The Skin" – 2:28
 "Everyman" – 2:16
 "Rocky Road Blues" (Bill Monroe) – 3:52
 "(Hold On) Annie Mae" – 3:50
 "Joyful Resurrection" – 3:33
 "Give Me Another Trojan Song" – 3:01
 "What Did I Know" – 2:36
 "Sweet Things To Come" – 2:14
 "And I Love You" – 2:23
 "Champagne Love" (Doug Clifford, Tom Fogerty) – 2:52
 "Tricia Suzanne" – 2:57
 "Mystery Train" (Junior Parker, Sam Phillips) – 3:23
 "Deal It Out" (Hans Olson) – 3:14
 "Sometimes" – 4:45
 "Sloop John B" (traditional) – 4:43

References

Tom Fogerty albums
1999 compilation albums